Jay Bateman (born July 16, 1973) is an American football coach who is currently the inside linebackers coach for the Florida Gators. He was previously the co-defensive coordinator and safeties coach at the University of North Carolina at Chapel Hill. A former Broyles Award finalist, he has also had assistant coaching stints at Ball State, Army as well as a head coaching stint at Siena from 2000 to 2003.

Coaching career 
He got into coaching when the owner sold the company, working as an assistant coach at Benedictine High School in Richmond. He got his first job in the college ranks at Hampden–Sydney College in 1997 as a graduate assistant, working with the defensive line and linebackers. He was named the defensive coordinator at Siena College in New York in 1999, and was promoted to head coach in 2000. At the time of his promotion, he was said to be the youngest head coach in Division I football at 26. After the football program was shut down in 2003, he joined the coaching staff at Richmond in 2004 as their assistant secondary coach, on a coaching staff that had future college and NFL assistants, such as Mike Elko, Patrick Graham, and Marcus Satterfield. He also had assistant coaching stints under Pete Lembo at Lehigh, Elon, and Ball State.

Army 
Bateman was named the defensive coordinator at Army in 2014. He was suspended in 2017 when it was revealed that he had received improper information from former Wake Forest radio announcer Tommy Elrod. In addition to the suspension, he was also fined $25,000 and forced to attend an ethics training program. 

Bateman was named a finalist for the Broyles Award in 2018, the award given to the top assistant coach in college football. In his tenure with Army, he improved the Black Knights defense from 91st overall in 2014 to 8th in the country in 2018.

North Carolina 
Bateman was named the co-defensive coordinator and safeties coach at North Carolina on December 9, 2018. He and co-coordinator Tommy Thigpen oversaw the position change and development of former quarterback Chazz Surratt into an all-conference linebacker and NFL draftee and brought in several top defensive recruits to the program, being a key player in the Tar Heels' recruiting upswing. After three years leading the Tar Heel defense, Bateman and UNC agreed to part ways after the 2021 season, which featured the worst defensive unit of his tenure.

Florida 
In January 2022, Bateman joined Billy Napier's staff at Florida as the inside linebackers coach.

Head coaching record

Personal life 
Bateman and his wife Heather have two children, Bea and C.J.. C.J. was diagnosed with autism in 2016. Bateman cited that one of the reasons he took the North Carolina job was because UNC and Duke are two of the biggest research institutions in the country and hoped to improve the quality of living for his son.

References

External links
 
 Florida profile

1973 births
Living people
American football linebackers
Army Black Knights football coaches
Ball State Cardinals football coaches
Elon Phoenix football coaches
Florida Gators football coaches
Hampden–Sydney Tigers football coaches
North Carolina Tar Heels football coaches
Randolph–Macon Yellow Jackets football players
Siena Saints football coaches
High school football coaches in Virginia
Sportspeople from Richmond, Virginia
Coaches of American football from Virginia
Players of American football from Richmond, Virginia